The 1990 Football Championship of the Belarusian SSR was the 54th regular annual competition in football of the Byelorussian Soviet Socialist Republic at all-republican level. In the competition took part 48 teams in two tiers.

Overview
The championship consisted of three tiers: First (Pershaja), Second (Druhaja) leagues and Trade Union competitions. Six teams were participating in the All-Union competitions and represented all the regional centers of Belarusian SSR: Dynama Mensk, Dynama Brest, Dnepr Mahiljow, KIM Vitsebsk, Njoman Hrodna, Homselmash Homiel.

The First League was contested by 16 teams, and Sputnik Minsk won the championship.

Pershaja Liha

Teams

Final standings

Druhaja Liha

Subgroup 1 final standings

Subgroup 2 final standings

References
 RSSSF
 history of the USSR championships among KFK (tables) (История первенств CCCР среди КФК  (таблицы)). regional-football.ru

Football Championship of the Belarusian SSR
Football
Belarus